The Sierra Madre Range is a mountain range in the western United States, located in south-central Wyoming and north-central Colorado. Geologically, it may be considered an extension of the Park Range of Colorado. South of the Great Divide Basin, the US Continental Divide runs along the Sierre Madre high points. Its western basins drain into the Colorado River and its eastern into the North Platte River. Buck Mountain (11,396 feet (3474 m)) is the highest peak in the range and lies within Colorado. Bridger Peak is its highest elevation on the Wyoming side of the range.

Copper resources within the range were extracted during the late 19th and early 20th centuries by the Ferris-Haggarty mine which lies about two miles west of Bridger Peak. Its operations were centered near Encampment 15 miles to the east. Gold findings in the range during the 1890s sparked a short-lived gold rush that attracted thousands of prospectors. The possibility of further discoveries renewed interest during the late 20th and early 21st centuries.

Much of the range lies within the Medicine Bow – Routt National Forest. Protected areas include the Encampment River Wilderness, the Huston Park Wilderness, and parts of the Mount Zirkel Wilderness.

The range supports a number of popular game species, including elk, mule deer, and grouse, along with other species mentioned in the state's Comprehensive Wildlife Conservation Strategy Report. In 2009 the state's Game and Fish Department, describing its wildlife as "world class", issued a report recommending that the area's natural values be analyzed and that energy development leases in the area be withdrawn.

See also
 List of mountain ranges in Wyoming

References

 
 . Sierra Madre. Wyoming State Geological Survey. Accessed 2010-10-20.
  Carbon County, Wyoming Highlights. Carbon County Visitors Council. Accessed 2010-10-21.

Mountain ranges of Wyoming
Ranges of the Rocky Mountains
Landforms of Carbon County, Wyoming